Sistotremastrum suecicum is a species of fungus belonging to the family Hydnodontaceae.

It is native to Eurasia and Northern America.

References

Trechisporales